Gowy Daraq may refer to:
 Gowy Daraq-e Olya
 Gowy Daraq-e Sofla